The following lists events that happened during 1946 in the Grand Duchy of Luxembourg.

Incumbents

Events

January – March

April – June
 17 April – Luxembourg signs a convention with France and Belgium to place the Luxembourg railway network in the hands of the Société Nationale des Chemins de Fer Luxembourgeois, in which France and Belgium each take a 24.5% stake.
 29 April – The Mayor of Luxembourg City, Gaston Diderich, dies in office and is succeeded by Émile Hamilius.
 14 May – Société Nationale des Chemins de Fer Luxembourgeois is founded.
 13 June – Charles Marx dies in a car crash.  He was replaced in the government by Dominique Urbany eight days later.

July – September
 14 July – Former British Prime Minister Winston Churchill visits Luxembourg for two days.
 29 August – In a cabinet reshuffle, the independent Guillaume Konsbruck is replaced by the CSV's Lambert Schaus.

October – December
 28 November – Former Prime Minister Pierre Prüm is sentenced to four years in prison for collaboration with Nazi Germany.

Births
 6 January – Victor Gillen, member of the Council of State
 22 February – Marc Fischbach, politician
 6 April – Mario Hirsch, journalist
 7 April – Léon Krier, architect
 4 December – Pierre Even, composer

Deaths
 29 April – Gaston Diderich, politician
 13 June – Charles Marx, politician
 24 October – Hubert Loutsch, politician and former Prime Minister

Footnotes

References